Boris Petrovich Ignatyev (born 5 December 1940) is a Russian football manager and former player. In 1996–1998 he coached the Russia national team.

As a footballer, Ignatyev spent only one season in the Soviet Top League, with Volga Gorky in 1964. He played as a midfielder.

As a manager, Ignatyev won European Under-19 Football Championship in 1988 with USSR team.

External links
Profile at RussiaTeam 

1940 births
Living people
Russian footballers
Soviet footballers
Soviet football managers
Russian football managers
Russia national football team managers
FC Moscow managers
FC Saturn Ramenskoye managers
Russian Premier League managers
Shandong Taishan F.C. managers
FC Torpedo Moscow managers
FC Zhenis Astana players
FC Neftyanik Ufa players
FC Izhevsk players
Russian expatriate sportspeople in Kazakhstan
Expatriate football managers in China
Association football midfielders
FC Dynamo Moscow reserves players
FC Volga Nizhny Novgorod players
Russian expatriate football managers
FC Dynamo Makhachkala players
Russian expatriate sportspeople in China